The Franzis Verlag GmbH is a German publisher based in Haar, Germany and part of the WEKA Mediengruppe. Founded in 1920 as a publishing house for technical books, it now offers both technical and computer-related books and software, including the German distribution of products such as Photomatix Pro and Alcohol 120%.

References

External links
Official homepage

Book publishing companies of Germany
Publishing companies of Germany
Companies based in Bavaria
Publishing companies established in 1920